Bradford West is a constituency represented in the House of Commons of the UK Parliament since 2015 by Naz Shah of the Labour Party.

Constituency profile
Bradford West covers the Bradford city centre, Manningham, Allerton and Clayton. It has a significant Pakistani population and a majority of Muslim voters.

History
Before 1974, the Labour and Conservative Parties held the seat marginally in various years, since which time the Labour Party always won the seat, with the exception of the 2012 Bradford West by-election. In 1981, however, Edward Lyons, the sitting Bradford West MP, joined the newly established Social Democratic Party, consequently losing the seat at the 1983 general election.

In 1997, the seat was one of only two Labour seats in the country, the other being Bethnal Green and Bow in London, to have seen a swing towards the Conservatives away from Labour. This was because the local party association had selected a Sikh, Marsha Singh to stand when the majority of the seat's population is Muslim.

George Galloway of the Respect Party won the seat in the 2012 Bradford West by-election with 55.9% of the votes cast; his 30.9% majority was at the time the largest majority in the history of the modern constituency, but he lost the seat in 2015 to the new Labour candidate Naz Shah by a substantial (28.3%) margin. Despite Galloway's threats to contest the result, he neither launched a legal challenge nor stood again in 2017, in which Shah surpassed his record by winning a majority of 48.1%, the largest margin for a Bradford West MP in any incarnation of the seat. Despite Galloway not standing, his former Respect colleague Salma Yaqoob did stand as an Independent, garnering 6,345 votes (13.9%), not far behind the second-placed Conservative candidate.

At the 2019 general election Shah increased her vote share by 11.5%. This was easily the highest increase in the Labour Party's vote share in any constituency in the United Kingdom, in an election where Labour's vote share decreased in all but 13 constituencies. This means that Bradford West has bucked the national trend twice, as it also did in 1997. Bradford West, since 2019, can be considered one of the safest seat in West Yorkshire for Labour.

Boundaries 

1885–1918: The Municipal Borough of Bradford wards of Allerton, Bolton, Great Horton, Heaton, and Manningham.

1955–1974: The County Borough of Bradford wards of Allerton, Great Horton, Heaton, Manningham, and Thornton.

1974–1983: The County Borough of Bradford wards of Allerton, Heaton, Little Horton, Manningham, Thornton, and University.

1983–2010: The City of Bradford wards of Clayton, Heaton, Little Horton, Thornton, Toller, and University.

2010–present: The City of Bradford wards of City, Clayton and Fairweather Green, Heaton, Manningham, Thornton and Allerton, and Toller.

Members of Parliament 

The constituency was originally created in 1885, but was abolished in 1918. For the 1955 general election the constituency was recreated, following a boundary review.

Elections

Election results

Elections since 1918

Elections 1885–1918

See also 
 List of parliamentary constituencies in West Yorkshire

Notes

References

External links 
nomis Constituency Profile for Bradford West — presenting data from the ONS annual population survey and other official statistics.

Parliamentary constituencies in Yorkshire and the Humber
Constituencies of the Parliament of the United Kingdom established in 1885
Constituencies of the Parliament of the United Kingdom disestablished in 1918
Constituencies of the Parliament of the United Kingdom established in 1955
Politics of Bradford